SmartUse is a collaborative construction software. The solution offers a touch friendly mobile app who helps construction projects to move in a paperless environment through features like field markups, photos and issues tracking.

SmartUse is a privately-held company based in Montreal, Canada. Founded in 2012 by Dominic Sévigny, the company was sold to Newforma in 2014 and re-acquired in September 2017 by the original founder and Louis Dagenais.

SmartUse is available on Windows since 2012 and on iPad since 2016.

References

External links

Construction software